The British Columbia Aviation Museum is located in Sidney, British Columbia, Canada. It is on the grounds of the Victoria International Airport at 1910 Norseman Road on the east side of the airport.

The Museum consists of a display area spread over two hangars, a classroom, a restoration workshop and a gift shop. Displays include historical civilian and military artifacts including uniforms, medals and models. Aircraft are displayed and museum volunteers are constantly working on restoring new acquisitions.

In September 2018 the museum acquired Avro Lancaster FM104, which is one of only 17 surviving Lancasters in the world. The aircraft, which was formerly in storage in Toronto, is now under restoration to airworthy status and will be finished in her post-War search-and-rescue configuration. In January 2021, the museum acquired an Grumman S2F Tracker that had been in storage with the Canadian Military Education Centre.

Collection

Aircraft

Helicopters

References

External links 

Aerospace museums in British Columbia
Saanich Peninsula